A Moon of Nickel and Ice is a Canadian documentary film, directed by François Jacob and released in 2017. The film profiles history and culture of the isolated Russian mining city of Norilsk.

Awards
The film was screened at the 2017 Hot Docs Canadian International Documentary Festival, where Jacob won the Emerging Canadian Filmmaker Award. At the DOXA Documentary Film Festival, the film received an honourable mention for the Best Canadian Documentary Film award.

The film received three Canadian Screen Award nominations at the 6th Canadian Screen Awards, for Best Feature Length Documentary, Best Cinematography in a Documentary (Jacob, Vuk Stojanovic and Ilya Zima) and Best Editing in a Documentary (Jacob and Jéricho Jeudy).

References

External links
 

2017 films
2017 documentary films
Canadian documentary films
Documentary films about Russia
Documentary films about mining
French-language Canadian films
2010s Canadian films